Sir Francis Bodenham (c. 1582 – 1645) was an English politician who sat in the House of Commons in 1626.

Bodenham was the son of Sir William Bodenham, of Ryhall, Rutland. He matriculated at Sidney Sussex College, Cambridge in April 1601. He was admitted at Gray's Inn  on 4 February 1603. In 1615, he was Sheriff of Rutland. He was knighted in 1616. In 1626, he was elected Member of Parliament for Rutland.

He married Penelope Wingfield (d. 1625), a daughter of Sir Edward Wingfield (d. 1603) of Kimbolton Castle and Mary Harington, and secondly Theodosia Hastings, daughter of Francis Hastings, Lord Hastings and Sarah Harington.

References

1580s births
1645 deaths
English MPs 1626
Alumni of Sidney Sussex College, Cambridge
Members of Gray's Inn
High Sheriffs of Rutland